Softley is a surname. Notable people with the surname include: 

Iain Softley (born 1956), English film director, producer, and screenwriter
Mick Softley (1939–2017), British singer-songwriter and guitarist
Mortimer Softley (born 1975), Guyanese reggae singer better known as Natural Black
Timothy Softley, British academic